The 1940 Ball State Cardinals football team was an American football team that represented Ball State Teachers College (later renamed Ball State University) as a member of the Indiana Intercollegiate Conference (IIC) during the 1940 college football season. In their eighth season under head coach John Magnabosco, the Cardinals compiled a 3–4–1 record (2–3 against IIC opponents), tied for ninth place out 14 teams in the conference, and outscored opponents by a total of 78 to 69. The team played its home games at Ball State Field in Muncie, Indiana.

Schedule

References

Ball State
Ball State Cardinals football seasons
Ball State Cardinals football